Lew Luton (1933–2018) was an Australian actor, singer and presenter. He worked for ten years in Britain appearing on shows like Crossroads. He was a DJ and presenter of Teen Time when he got into acting.  Annette Andre, who worked with him, recalled he was "strange, but we got on well."

Select Credits
Wuthering Heights (1959)
Whiplash
The Countess from Hong Kong (1967)
Moon Zero Two (1969)

References

External links
Lew Luton at IMDb
Lew Luton at Ausstage
Lew Luton at BFI

Australian actors
1933 births
2018 deaths